Joseph Siah Bradshaw (August 17, 1897 – January 30, 1985) was a pitcher in Major League Baseball. He pitched in two games for the 1929 Brooklyn Robins, working four innings and allowing two earned runs.

External links

1897 births
1985 deaths
People from Dyer County, Tennessee
Baseball players from Tennessee
Major League Baseball pitchers
Brooklyn Robins players
New Orleans Pelicans (baseball) players
Toledo Mud Hens players
Birmingham Barons players
Columbus Senators players
Wilkes-Barre Barons (baseball) players
Manchester Blue Sox players